Punyavathi is a 1967 Telugu-language drama film, produced by Vasu Menon under the Vasu Studios banner and directed by V. Dadamirasi. It stars N. T. Rama Rao, Krishna Kumari and Shobhan Babu, with music composed by Ghantasala. The film was a remake of the Hindi film Nai Roshni (1967).

Plot
Professor Krishna Rao (S. V. Ranga Rao) is a great educationist. During his youth, he loves a woman named Parvathi (Pandaribai) and marries her. The couple has a son Prakash (N. T. Rama Rao) and due to some dire circumstances, their family gets separated. After the sincere search for his lost wife and son, Krishna Rao marries another woman Padmavathi (Bhanumathi Ramakrishna) eventually. This couple has two children Shekar (Shobhan Babu) and Chitra (Jyothi Lakshmi). Along with these kids, Krishna Rao adopts a friend's daughter Shanti (Krishnakumari). Padmavathi is an irresponsible woman who neglects family life and goes to clubs and parties. To make things worse, she makes Chitra accustomed to this lifestyle. As a result, Chitra falls for the wrong man Ramesh (Haranath), gets pregnant, and commits suicide when she gets cheated on. Sekhar gets shattered by his sister's unfortunate demise and becomes a heavy drunkard in the rice mill where he works. He roams around with fellow industry workers in search of affection and love. Meanwhile, Parvathi takes care of her son well and he becomes a lecturer, but he grows up with hatred towards his father. Incidentally, Prakash takes guidance from Professor Krishna Rao not being aware that the latter is his father. Prakash even falls for Shanthi who stays in the Professor's house and as time passes by, a great bonding of respect forms between Prakash and Krishna Rao.  The saddened parents Krishna Rao and Padmavathi become bedridden with Chitra's death and with Shanti's good words, Sekhar comes to the family's rescue. He unites the family with great difficulty and the film ends happily when Krishna Rao and Padmavathi realize the greatness of Punyavathi- none other than his first wife Parvathi.

Cast
N. T. Rama Rao as Prakash
Krishna Kumari as Shanti 
Shobhan Babu as Sekhar
S. V. Ranga Rao as Professor Krishna Rao
Bhanumathi Ramakrishna as Padmavathi
V. Nagayya as Judge Lakshmana Rao
Haranath as Ramesh
Allu Ramalingaiah  
K. V. Chalam
Pandari Bai as Parvathi
Jyothi Lakshmi as Chitra 
Radha Kumari

Soundtrack

Music composed by Ghantasala. Lyrics were written by C. Narayana Reddy. Music released by Audio Company.

References

Indian drama films
Telugu remakes of Hindi films
Films scored by Ghantasala (musician)
1960s Telugu-language films
Films based on works by Nihar Ranjan Gupta